State Road 143 (SR 143) is a north–south route in Jennings, Hamilton County, Florida, running from I-75 to US 41.

South of I-75, County Road 143 continues through SR 6 at Blue Springs toward CR 141 near Twin Rivers State Forest.

At its northern terminus with US 41, SR 143 connects with County Road 141, which goes north to the Georgia border, becoming State Route 135.

Major intersections

References

143
143
143